Artern (Kreis Artern) was a Kreis (district) in the Bezirk (district)  of Halle in the German Democratic Republic (GDR). From 1990 to 1994 it persisted as Landkreis Artern in the state of Thüringen. It occupied land that is for the most part modern Kyffhäuserkreis in Thüringen.

History
In 1952, the GDR undertook comprehensive reform in the division of its districts. Artern was formed out of the remaining part of the Landkreis (rural district) that had existed before the reform and was assigned to the newly formed Bezirk of Halle. 

After the reunification of Germany, in 1990 Artern was assigned to the state of Thüringen, which had once again been founded, and through the districting reforms of the reunified Germany was included in Kyffhäuserkreis and in Sömmerda (district).

Geography
Artern, which lay in the Kyffhäuser, is traversed by the Helme and Unstrut. The largest settled areas near the district capital Artern were the cities Bad Frankenhausen, Heldrungen, and Wiehe and the parish of Roßleben. Other neighboring settled areas included the parishes of Bilzingsleben, Borxleben, Bottendorf, Bretleben, Donndorf, Esperstedt. Gehofen, Gorsleben, Hauteroda, Heygendorf, Ichstedt, Kalbsrieth, Kannawurf, Nausitz, Oberheldrungen, Reinsdorf, Ringleben Schönewerda, and Voigtstedt.

Economy
Important firms in the district, among others, included
VEB Kyffhäuserhütte Artern
VEB Zuckerfabrik Artern
VEB Kaliwerk Roßleben
VEB Plastmaschinenwerk Wiehe
VEB Brau- und Malzfabrik Sangerhausen, Werk Artern
VEB Elektro Bad Frankenhausen

See also
Sondershausen (district)
Kyffhäuserkreis

External links
http://www.digizeit-cms.de/main/dms/toc/?PPN=PPN514402644

Districts of Thuringia
Former districts of Germany